KALLITECHNIS is the stage name of Cassandra Kouremenos, a Canadian musician from Montreal, Quebec, whose single "Gifted" received a Juno Award nomination for Contemporary R&B/Soul Recording of the Year at the Juno Awards of 2022.

After releasing music independently to SoundCloud, she first became known when she was a featured artist on Lou Phelps's 2016 single "Average". She released her debut EP Wet Paint in 2017, and followed up with Chromatic in 2019, Because It Feels Good in 2021 and It's Not Personal in 2022.

References

21st-century Canadian women singers
Canadian rhythm and blues singers
Singers from Montreal
Canadian people of Greek descent
Living people
Year of birth missing (living people)